A social media policy is a policy which advises representatives of an organization on their use of social media.

Various businesses have social media policies.

Various health care organizations have social media policies.

Government use of social media has special considerations.

Libraries can have social media policies.

Athletic programs can have social media policies.

There has been social media policy research in Sweden.

References

Further reading
Designing Social Media Policy for Government, 2010

Social media
Social policy